Donald D. Patterson (March 18, 1911 – November 30, 1972) was a businessman and political figure in New Brunswick, Canada. He represented the City of St. John in the Legislative Assembly of New Brunswick as a Progressive Conservative member from 1952 to 1967.

He was born in Saint John, New Brunswick, the son of Hamilton Patterson. In 1938, he married Mildred Chase. Patterson served as the Provincial Secretary-Treasurer from 1952 to 1960.

References 
 Canadian Parliamentary Guide, 1956, PG Normandin

1911 births
1972 deaths
Politicians from Saint John, New Brunswick
Progressive Conservative Party of New Brunswick MLAs
Members of the Executive Council of New Brunswick
Finance ministers of New Brunswick